The 2012 KNSB Dutch Single Distance Championships were a speed skating event held at the Thialf ice stadium in Heerenveen from 4 November until 6 November 2011. Although the tournament was held in 2011 it was the 2012 edition as it is part of the 2011/2012 speed skating season.

Schedule

Medalists

Men 

Men's results: Schaatsen.nl   & SchaatsStatistieken.nl

Women 

Women's results: Schaatsen.nl   & SchaatsStatistieken.nl

References

External links
 KNSB

Dutch Single Distance Championships
Single Distance Championships
2012 Single Distance
KNSB Dutch Single Distance Championships, 2012